Acacia isoneura is a shrub belonging to the genus Acacia and the subgenus Juliflorae that is endemic to western Australia.

Description
The glabrous branchlets are sericeous between the ribs and towards the apices. The green to grey-green coloured glabrous phyllodes are soft and flexible. It blooms from July to September producing yellow flowers. The simple inflorescences occur singly or in pairs in the axils and have an obloid to stoutly cylindrical shape with a length of  packed with golden flowers.

Taxonomy
There are two recognised subspecies:
 Acacia isoneura subsp. isoneura
 Acacia isoneura subsp. nimia

Distribution
It is native to an area in the Mid West and Wheatbelt regions of Western Australia where it grows in flats, sandplains, low rises and ridges in stony sandy soils. The bulk of the population is found from Mingenew
in the north to Perenjori and Wubin in the south.

See also
 List of Acacia species

References

isoneura
Acacias of Western Australia
Plants described in 1999
Taxa named by Bruce Maslin